Vladimir Aleksandrov (born 8 January 1945) is a Soviet sailor. He competed in the 5.5 Metre event at the 1968 Summer Olympics.

References

External links
 

1945 births
Living people
Soviet male sailors (sport)
Olympic sailors of the Soviet Union
Sailors at the 1968 Summer Olympics – 5.5 Metre
Sportspeople from Moscow